The Philadelphia Catholic League is a high school sports league composed (as of the 2012-13 year) of 18 Catholic High Schools in Philadelphia and the surrounding Pennsylvania suburbs. The league itself was founded in the summer of 1920 on the steps of Villanova academy (now Alumni Hall on Villanova University's campus) by Monsignor Bonner. The league originally consisted of three sports, one per season: Football in the fall, Basketball in the winter and Baseball in the spring. This was expanded in 1944 to include Cross-country in the fall, Wrestling in the winter, and Track in the spring.

Currently, the schools are divided by size (Red/Large, Blue/Small).  In football, the blue and red divisions award separate league championships each year, while all other sports have a unified champion.  Starting with the 2008–09 school year, the Catholic League joined the Pennsylvania Interscholastic Athletic Association in District XII, competing with Philadelphia Public League teams for a restored City Championship in all sports, which was abandoned following the 1979–80 school year due to a dispute of Title IX as girls from both Public and Catholic high schools were prohibited from competing for City Championships.  The football divisions were realigned into Blue AA, Blue AAA, and Red (AAAA) Following the closures of Northeast Catholic High School and Cardinal Dougherty High School, along with the merger of Kennedy-Kenrick Catholic High School into Pope John Paul II High School, along with their decision to join the Pioneer Athletic Conference in Montgomery County, the divisions underwent a realignment in 2010.

Member schools
 Archbishop John Carroll High School (Delaware County)
 Archbishop Ryan High School  (Philadelphia)
 Archbishop Wood Catholic High School (Bucks County)
 Cardinal O'Hara High School (Delaware County)
 Saints John Neumann and Maria Goretti Catholic High School (Philadelphia)
 Conwell-Egan Catholic High School (Bucks)
 Lansdale Catholic High School (Montgomery County)
 West Catholic Preparatory High School (Philadelphia)
 Little Flower Catholic High School for Girls (Philadelphia; girls only)
 Saint Hubert High School (Philadelphia; girls only)
* Archbishop Prendergast High School (Delaware County; girls only)*

* Monsignor Bonner High School (Delaware County; boys only)*
 Devon Preparatory School (Chester County; boys only)
 Father Judge High School (Philadelphia; boys only)
 Roman Catholic High School for Boys (Philadelphia; boys only)
 Saint Joseph's Preparatory School (Philadelphia; boys only)
 La Salle College High School (Montgomery; boys only)
* — As of 2012–13, the school competes under the combined names of the schools, Bonner-Prendergast.

Former members
 Villanova Preparatory Academy (now Malvern Prep) 1920-1923
 Salesianium Catholic High School 1922-1939
 Cathedral Catholic High School 1927-1928
 St. John's Catholic High School 1935-1950
 South Catholic High School 1935-1955
 St. Thomas More Catholic High School 1937-1976
 St. James Catholic High School 1943-1993
 John. W. Hallahan Catholic Girls High School 1901-2021 (Philadelphia; girls only)
 Northeast Catholic High School 1926-2010
 Cardinal Dougherty High School 1956-2010
 Kennedy-Kenrick Catholic High School 1966-2010 (first as Bishop Kenrick High School until 1993)
 Bishop McDevitt High School 1958-2021

See also

Roman Catholic Archdiocese of Philadelphia
Sports in Philadelphia#Catholic League

External links

Philadelphia Catholic League Track and Field/Cross Country Website *

References

High school sports conferences and leagues in the United States
High school sports associations in the United States
Pennsylvania high school sports conferences
Sports in Philadelphia
Roman Catholic Archdiocese of Philadelphia
1920 establishments in Pennsylvania
Catholic sports organizations
Sports organizations established in 1920